Ford is an extinct town in Bartow County, in the U.S. state of Georgia.

History
A post office called Ford was established in 1888, and remained in operation until 1907. The community has the name of Joseph Ford, a pioneer citizen.

References

Geography of Bartow County, Georgia
Ghost towns in Georgia (U.S. state)